Lancaster Precinct is one of the eight precincts of Wabash County, Illinois. Like Friendsville Precinct, there is an unincorporated community in the precinct, Lancaster, Illinois.

Precincts in Wabash County, Illinois